West Zone Power Distribution Company Limited (WZPDCL) is a state owned utility and electricity distribution company in Bangladesh and is located in Khulna, Bangladesh.

History
West Zone Power Distribution Company Limited was established in November 2002. It was founded as a public limited company under the Companies Act, 1994. The western zone of Bangladesh Power Development Board which included Khulna Division, Barisal Division, and greater Faridpur region (Padma Division) was placed under West Zone Power Distribution Company Limited on 1 October 2003. The company signed Provisional Vendor's Agreement (VA) and Provisional Power Sales Agreement with the Bangladesh Power Development Board on 23 March 2005. The company took over the operations and distributions of the board in the Western zone. Bangladesh Power Development Board employees in the Western Zone joined West Zone Power Distribution Company Limited on 16 December 2007.

Organizational structure and workforce management

Operation and Maintenance Department

ICT Division 
The advancement of Information Communication Technology makes the vast treasure of all forms of knowledge, information, inventions, methodologies, techniques, process and technologies from entire globe available by accessing through internet. With the advent of 'Digital Bangladesh' as a prime focus of the government, e-Government got a renewed vigor with the highest priority of the government. E-Governance is the application of Information and Communication Technology (ICT) for delivering government services, exchange of information communication transactions, integration of various stand-alone systems and services between Government-to-Citizens (G2C), Government-to-Business (G2B), and Government-to-Government (G2G) as well as back-office processes and interactions within the entire government frame work.

Development of ICT is closely associated with 'bringing government services to the 'citizen's door steps'. This is the main essence of designing ICT development in WZPDCL.

Major ICT-related activities 

 Enterprise Resource Planning (ERP)
 Bill on Web for Customer Service
 Integrated Online Payment Gateway & Mobile Financial Service
 Pre-payment Metering System
 Online New Connection Software
 Online Recruitment System
 Web Based Store Management Software
 Customer Service through Call Center (16117)
 Customer Service through Android App
 Shutdown Management System
 Web Portal updating and monitoring 
 E-tendering System through e-GP
 E-filing System
 Network, Hardware And Cyber Security Related Activities
 Digital Attendance System
 Close Circuit Camera for Monitoring
 Domain Mail System
 Training Management Software
 Disaster Recovery Center (DRC)
 GIS and SCADA
 Video Conferencing System Amongst WZPDCL  and Other Entities of The Power Sector
 Innovation Showcasing
 Social Media Activities (Facebook, Twitter, YouTube, Instagram, LinkedIn)
Innovation, Modernization and others responsibilities to the related field.

References

Government-owned companies of Bangladesh
2002 establishments in Bangladesh
Electric power companies of Bangladesh
Electric power distribution network operators
Organisations based in Khulna